Odoardo Vicinelli (1684–1755) was an Italian painter of the late-Baroque period.

He trained under Giovanni Maria Morandi of Florence. In Rome he also worked with Pietro Nelli. He painted a Madonna and Child with Saints Ignatius, Francesco Borgia, Stanislao Kostka, Aloysius Gonzaga, Francis Xavier, and the blessed Claudio Acquaviva now at the Diocesan Museum next the Sermoneta Cathedral.

References

1684 births
1755 deaths
17th-century Italian painters
Italian male painters
18th-century Italian painters
Painters from Tuscany
Italian Baroque painters
18th-century Italian male artists